My Next Guest Needs No Introduction with David Letterman (commonly referred to as My Next Guest) is an American talk show hosted by David Letterman that premiered on January 12, 2018, on Netflix. The series consists of interviews with one guest per episode both inside and outside a studio setting. The show has received generally positive reviews, with its format, Letterman's hosting, choice of guests, and insightful conversations receiving praise. My Next Guest has been nominated for the Primetime Emmy Award for Outstanding Hosted Nonfiction Series or Special 4 times.

Production

Development
On August 8, 2017, Netflix announced it had ordered a six-episode interview series starring David Letterman. Each hour-long episode was set to feature Letterman conducting a long-form conversation with a single guest and in-the-field segments, in which he would explore topics on his own.

On January 5, 2018, it was announced that Letterman's guests in the first season would include Barack Obama, George Clooney, Malala Yousafzai, Jay-Z, Tina Fey, and Howard Stern. It was also announced that the series would premiere on January 12, 2018, with Letterman's interview with Obama. This interview was Obama's first since leaving office. 

On December 14, 2018, it was announced that Netflix had renewed the series for a second season consisting of six episodes. On May 31, 2019, five new episodes were released. On June 21, a bonus episode was released.

Music
The show's theme song and bridging music were written and recorded by Letterman's long-time bandleader, Paul Shaffer. Soon after it was announced publicly that Netflix had given the series an order, Shaffer received a phone call from Letterman asking him to work on the show. Soon after, Shaffer began to receive cuts of episodes from the first season and he started to put music in afterwards where the director thought it was needed.

In developing the sound of the show's music, Shaffer initially looked to Letterman for guidance. Finding none, he remembered his and Letterman's shared love for the sort of music produced at the Muscle Shoals Sound Studio in Sheffield, Alabama describing it as "the honesty you hear, the southern soul feeling." The score initially included drums but the show's producers and director thought that the music should "feel like it's Dave's old friend Paul playing," so it was ultimately stripped down to solely include piano, organ, and bass guitar.

Episodes

Series overview

Season 1 (2018)

Bonus (2018)

Season 2 (2019)

Bonus (2019)

Special (2019)

Season 3 (2020)

Season 4 (2022)

Special (2022)

Reception

Critical response
The first season of My Next Guest Needs No Introduction has been met with a positive response from critics. On the review aggregation website Rotten Tomatoes, the first season holds an 83% approval rating with an average rating of 6.79 out of 10 based on 29 reviews. The website's critical consensus reads, "My Next Guest may not be groundbreaking, but a more intimate setting provides ample room for intelligent, insightful interviews with interesting subjects that go beyond standard late-night conversations." Metacritic, which uses a weighted average, assigned the season a score of 70 out of 100 based on 13 critics, indicating "generally favorable reviews".

Awards and nominations

Notes

References

External links
 
 

2018 American television series debuts
David Letterman
English-language Netflix original programming
2010s American television talk shows
Television series by Worldwide Pants